Moloko were an Irish-English electronic music duo formed in Sheffield, England, consisting of vocalist Róisín Murphy and producer Mark Brydon. Blending elements of electronica and dance music, they are best known for their UK top 10 singles "The Time Is Now" (2000) and "Familiar Feeling" (2003), as well as the 1999 Boris Dlugosch remix of "Sing It Back" which became an international hit.

History

Formation and success (1994–2000) 
Murphy had no prior professional singing experience when Moloko was formed,  while Brydon had previously worked on music as a producer with musicians such as Boy George and Cabaret Voltaire on releases from the 1990s. In 1994, the two met at a party in Sheffield, where Murphy approached Brydon with the chat-up line, "Do you like my tight sweater? See how it fits my body!" Its first sentence became their début album's title, recorded while the pair had begun dating. The name Moloko comes from the narcotic-filled milk drink, Moloko Plus, in the Anthony Burgess novel A Clockwork Orange, based on the Russian for milk, "молоко" ("moloko").

The group signed to Echo Records and released their single "Where Is the What If the What Is in Why?" The group's debut album Do You Like My Tight Sweater? was released in 1995. The group toured with Pulp following the release. The single "Fun for Me" was featured prominently on the Batman & Robin soundtrack and received radio airplay and strong MTV rotation. It reached number four in the US Dance chart. In 1997, their cover of "Are 'Friends' Electric?" featured on the Gary Numan tribute album Random.

After Moloko finished the tour, they built a home studio and recorded their second album, titled I Am Not a Doctor, which was released in 1998 in the United Kingdom. Though the album was unsuccessful, reaching only number 64 in the UK Albums Chart, a Boris Dlugosch remix of "Sing It Back", the third single from the album that originally failed to reach the Top 40 in the UK Singles Chart, was a huge hit, reaching number four in the UK chart and number one in the US Dance Chart. Moloko toured in support of the album, opening for Garbage in UK and Ireland in January and February 1999. 

Their third album Things to Make and Do was released in the year 2000 and reached number three in the UK Albums Chart. The first single, "The Time Is Now" was their biggest hit, charting at number two in the charts. They started touring as a full band along with percussionist Paul Slowly, keyboardist Eddie Stevens, and guitarist Dave Cooke.

Statues and disbandment (2003–2004) 
Their 2003 album Statues produced two hit singles, "Familiar Feeling", which reached number ten in the UK, and "Forever More", which reached number 17. Brydon and Murphy ended their romantic relationship in 2002, just before they began work on the album. Murphy toured without Brydon for eighteen months in support of the album throughout 2003 and 2004. The concert at the Brixton Academy, recorded on 22 November 2003, was released on the live DVD 11,000 Clicks in 2004. Following the tour, the group disbanded.

Post-disbandment (2004–present) 
Following the disbandment, both Murphy and Brydon began solo careers, with the former releasing her first solo album, Ruby Blue, in 2005. 

On 22 May 2006, the band announced their greatest hits album Catalogue, including the unreleased track "Bankrupt Emotionally", released on 17 July. The same year, Murphy and Brydon, along with long-time Moloko guitarist Cooke, briefly interrupted their hiatus to play a select number of acoustic radio performances. Commenting on the end of Moloko, in 2006, Murphy refused to give a definitive answer, saying "it's something that I don't know at the moment, and I refuse to make a definitive answer to that to be honest." In 2008, she further refused to definitely rule out a Moloko reunion, explaining "I would never say never. I know myself if I said, 'No, I'll never do that again,' five, 10 years down the line I'll end up fucking doing it and you'll come back and say, 'Ahhh - you said you'd never do it,' so I'm not going to say I'll never do it."

In 2015, Murphy collaborated with Moloko's touring keyboardist Eddie Stevens on her third studio album, Hairless Toys. That year, she said a Moloko reunion would not be happening "anytime soon" adding: "I really do enjoy my solo career… Why would we need to do Moloko again? We ought to just leave that where it was."

In 2016, Moloko digitally reissued their remixes on the compilation All Back To the Mine, split into two volumes and comprising a total of 68 tracks.

In 2019, the four Moloko albums were remastered and reissued on vinyl. Murphy explained that a reunion tour would be very unlikely at that point, joking "Brydon is geriatric now, so that’s out of the question." The same year, she said the idea of touring with Moloko was "totally off the table" explaining "I don’t want to become some kind of heritage act all of a sudden". At the suggestion of reuniting for a 25th anniversary tour, she joked "I'd rather die".

Since the band's disbandment, Murphy has performed several Moloko songs on her solo tours and live performances.

Style
Moloko's music has been described as alternative dance, dance-pop, experimental pop, dance-punk and electropop. Heather Phares of AllMusic described the sound of their debut album similar to that of Portishead and Massive Attack with elements of dance, funk, and trip hop, while noting the group had "a sense of humour and sass unique to Moloko."

Discography

Studio albums

Compilations

All Back to the Mine (2001) is a collection of 21 remixes (23 in Japan). Vol. I and Vol. II (2016) each contain 34 remixes, for a total of 68. Not all of the remixes on the 2001 version are included on the 2016 versions.

Singles

A: "Pure Pleasure Seeker" did not chart on the Flemish Ultratop 50, but peaked at number 15 on the Ultratip chart.
B: "Indigo" did not chart on the Flemish Ultratop 50, but peaked at number 16 on the Ultratip chart.
C: "Cannot Contain This" did not chart on the Flemish Ultratop 50, but peaked at number 3 on the Ultratip chart.

Video

Video albums

Awards and honours
"Best International Live Act" - Belgian TMF Awards 2004

See also
List of number-one dance hits (United States)
List of artists who reached number one on the US Dance chart

References

External links

Moloko at WhoSampled

 
English electronic music duos
English dance music groups
Musical groups established in 1994
Musical groups disestablished in 2003
Musical groups from Sheffield
Trip hop groups
Irish electronic music groups
Irish dance musicians
Irish musical duos